NGN can refer to :

 Neurogenins, a family of bHLH transcription factors involved in specifying neuronal differentiation
 Nigerian naira, currency by ISO 4217 code
 Noida Greater Noida Expressway, in Delhi, India

Telecommunications
 Next Generation Networking, a broad term to describe some key architectural evolutions in telecommunication core and access networks that will be deployed over the next 5–10 years
 Non-geographic numbers, in the UK, telephone numbers not assigned to geographic areas or exchanges

Media, publishing, and entertainment
 Nippon Golden Network, a Cable television network broadcasting Japanese programs in Hawaii, United States
No Good Nick, an upcoming American comedy web television series.
News Group Newspapers, the umbrella organisation for Rupert Murdoch's news empire.